Jeffrey Sneijder (born 16 September 1982) is a Dutch former footballer who played as a winger.

Club career
He started his career at Jong Ajax in a team with Maarten Stekelenburg and Rafael van der Vaart, before he was transferred to Stormvogels Telstar in July 2001. In February 2004 he injured his meniscus. He paused from football and began his comeback at Jong Ajax in July 2004 and 2005 he went to Jong RKC. He left Jong RKC in June 2006 and moved to FC Den Bosch, where he left in August 2007 to play for lower league side USV Elinkwijk.

Personal life
Jeffrey Sneijder is the brother of Wesley, and also Rodney also footballers, the former is retired. During an interview in a radio station in Thessaloniki, Sneijder's brother Rodney confirmed that he and Wesley Sneijder (along with their other brother Jeffrey) have part-Greek descent, since their grandmother (their father's mother) was a Greek woman born in Kavala, Macedonia, Greece and moved to Utrecht before World War II.

References

1982 births
Living people
Dutch footballers
AFC Ajax players
RKC Waalwijk players
FC Den Bosch players
Eerste Divisie players
Dutch people of Greek descent
Association football midfielders
Footballers from Utrecht (city)
USV Elinkwijk players